Journey of Dreams is an album by the South African vocal group Ladysmith Black Mambazo, released in 1988. Journey of Dreams also served as the title of a film about frontman Joseph Shabalala, directed by David Lister and shot around the same time. Shabalala chose the title in part to describe his journey from his birthplace of Ladysmith to international success. It also refers to his desire to get the sound he heard in his dreams on to record.

The album was nominated for a Grammy Award, in the "Best Traditional Folk Recording" category. The group supported it with North American tour.

Production
The album was coproduced by Russ Titelman. The group recorded two songs in tribute to Paul Simon, who had collaborated with them on Graceland. Simon also arranged and sang on the group's version of "Amazing Grace". "Hamba Dompasi (No More Passbook)" is about South Africa's pass laws. "Bavim' Indela (The Stumbling Block)" is a tribute to Miriam Makeba and Hugh Maskela. Ladysmith Black Mambazo sang two of the album's songs in English.

Critical reception

Robert Christgau noted that "Simon takes the lead on 'Amazing Grace', the 'Send in the Clowns' of roots music." The Philadelphia Inquirer determined that the album "elevates leader Joseph Shabalala's spirituals to theatrical heights." The Toronto Star called it "a candid weaving of spiritually inspired Zulu folklore interspersed with vivid accounts of Ladysmith's own history." 

The Philadelphia Daily News praised the "winsome, frisky folk harmony sound." The Richmond Times-Dispatch called Journey of Dreams "soulfully mesmerizing." The St. Louis Post-Dispatch admired "the lush fullness of 10 male voices in thick harmony [and] the intricate rhythmic shifts of Shabalala's lead vocals around the dense response of the choir."

Track listing

References

Ladysmith Black Mambazo albums
1988 albums
Warner Records albums